SRSP may refer to:

 Sarhad Rural Support Programme,a non-governmental organization working to alleviate poverty in Pakistan
 Scottish Republican Socialist Party, a political party of Scotland
 Sexuality Research and Social Policy, an academic journal
 Somali Revolutionary Socialist Party, a political party of Somalia which supported Siad Barre